Courtney Conlogue (born August 25, 1992) is an American professional surfer. She was born in Santa Ana, California. Courtney learned to surf at the age of 4. In 2004 when she was 11, Conlogue was the youngest athlete to be selected to the USA Junior Surf Team. She went on to achieve 11th place in the 2005 ISA World Junior Surfing Championships.  By the time she was 14, she had won a surfing gold medal as a member of the U.S. Team in the X Games. When she was 17 she won the biggest competition in the US at the Hurley U.S. Open of Surfing, held at her home break in Huntington Beach, California.

Conlogue suffered a major ankle injury while freesurfing before her heat at the Rip Curl Pro Bells Beach in Australia. She had to withdraw from the contest as well as the Rio Pro. However, later she ranked in #2 place for two years in a row for the World Surf League.

She was the winner of the U.S. Open of surfing in 2009 and 2018.

In 2019 she was inducted into the Surfing Walk of Fame as their Woman of the Year.

In 2020 she created her own brand, Sea Tiger, selling paintings, coffee, clothing...

Competitive highlights
 2018 #1 Vans US Open of Surfing- Huntington Beach, California 
 2017 Rank #4 
 2017 1st Rip Curl Women’s Pro – Australia
 2017 1st Outerknown Fiji Women’s Pro – Fiji
 2017 3rd Vans US Open of Surfing – California
 2016 Rank #2 WSL
 2016 3rd Maui Women’s Pro – Hawaii
 2016 3rd Roxy Pro – France
 2016 1st Cascais Women’s Pro – Portugal
 2016 3rd Oi Rio Women’s Pro – Brazil
 2016 2nd Women’s Drug Aware Margaret River Pro – Australia
 2016 1st Rip Curl Women’s Pro – Australia
 2016 2nd Roxy Pro Gold Coast – Australia
 2015 Ranked 2nd WSL
 2015 1st Cascais Women’s Pro – Portugal
 2015 3rd Vans US Open of Surfing – California
 2015 1st Oi Rio Women’s Pro – Brazil
 2015 1st Women’s Drug Aware Margaret River Pro – Australia
 2015 3rd Rip Curl Women’s Pro – Australia
 2014 Ranked 9th WSL
 2014 3rd Target Maui Pro – Hawaii
 2014 2nd Roxy Pro – France
 2013 Ranked 4th WSL
 2013 2nd Van’s US Open – California
 2013 1st TSB Bank Surf Festival – New Zealand
 2013 3rd Rip Curl Women’s Pro – Australia
 2012 Ranked 5th WSL
 2012 1st Commonwealth Bank Beachley Classic – Australia
 2011 Ranked 8th WSL

References 

 Profile in World Surf League

Living people
1992 births
American surfers
World Surf League surfers
American female surfers